Alan or Allan Shaw may refer to:

Sportsmen
Alan Shaw (footballer) (born 1923), Australian rules footballer
Alan Shaw (bowls), represented Jersey at the 2006 Commonwealth Games

Others
Alan H. Shaw, Norfolk Southern chief executive officer
Alan Lee Shaw (active since 1977), English guitarist
Allan Shaw (1927–1989), Anglican priest
A.G.L. Shaw (1916–2012), Australian historian

See also
Al Shaw (disambiguation)
Allanshaw (1874–1893), British iron sailing ship